Myponga may refer to:

Places in South Australia
Myponga, South Australia, a locality
Myponga Conservation Park, a protected area
Myponga Reservoir, a reservoir
Myponga River, a river
Myponga Wind Farm, a wind farm
Hundred of Myponga, a cadastral unit

Organisations and events in South Australia
Myponga Football Club
Myponga Pop Festival

See also
Myponga Beach, South Australia